John J. Gray is an American television writer, producer and director.

He is well known for his work on FXs American Horror Story.

Career
His career began on Joss Whedons Angel, as an assistant to Tim Minear. He went on to assist Minear on his further endeavors, including Firefly, The Inside, Dollhouse, Terriers, and The Chicago Code. He currently serves as executive producer on American Horror Story (created by Ryan Murphy and Brad Falchuk), and the 9-1-1 franchise created by Ryan Murphy, Brad Falchuk and Tim Minear of 9-1-1 and 9-1-1: Lone Star.

References

External links

American television writers
American male television writers
Living people
Year of birth missing (living people)
Place of birth missing (living people)